Riviersonderend is a village in the Overberg region of the Western Cape, South Africa, about  east of Cape Town. It is located on a loop of the Sonderend River, from which it takes its name. In the census of 2011 it was recorded as having a population of 5,245.

History
The village was established in 1923, when Edith S V McIntyre sold her farm, Tierhoek, to the local Dutch Reformed church council for 6000 pounds. First known as "Rivier Zonder End" (Dutch for "river without end"), the name later changed to the Afrikaans  "Riviersonderend".

The name itself was originally a literal translation of the Khoekhoe name "Kannakamkanna" ("river without end").

References

External links
History of Riviersonderend

Populated places in the Theewaterskloof Local Municipality